The 2012 AFL Tasmania TSL premiership season is a current Australian Rules Football competition staged across Tasmania, Australian over eighteen roster rounds plus one Regional round and six finals series matches between 31 March and 22 September 2012.

The League is known as the Wrest Point Tasmanian State League under a commercial naming-rights sponsorship agreement with Wrest Point Casino in Hobart and Federal Group.

Participating Clubs
Burnie Dockers Football Club
Clarence District Football Club
Devonport Football Club
Glenorchy District Football Club
Hobart Football Club
Lauderdale Football Club
Launceston Football Club
North Hobart Football Club
North Launceston Football Club
South Launceston Football Club

2012 TSL Club Coaches
Brent Plant (Burnie)
Matthew Drury (Clarence)
Glen Lutwyche (Devonport)
Ben Beams (Glenorchy)
{Anthony McConnon (Hobart)
Darren Winter (Lauderdale)
Anthony Taylor (Launceston)
Lance Spaulding (North Hobart)
Zane Littlejohn (North Launceston)
Mitch Thorp (South Launceston)

Current Leading Goalkickers: Tasmanian State League
Mitchell Williamson (Clarence) - 83
Adam Derbyshire (Launceston) - 71 
Trent Standen (Clarence) - 50 
Jaye Bowden (Glenorchy) - 48
Michael Cassidy (Lauderdale) - 46 
Aaron McNab (Devonport) - 45

Medal Winners
Jaye Bowden (Glenorchy) - Tassie Medal (TSL Seniors)
Joe Edwards (Lauderdale) - Eade Medal (TSL Colts) 
Jason Laycock (Burnie) - Darrel Baldock Medal (Best player in TSL Grand Final) 
Mitchell Williamson (Clarence) - Hudson Medal (TSL Leading Goalkicker) 
Aaron McNab (Devonport) - TSL Rookie of the Year.

TSL Colts Grand Final
Nth Launceston 11.9 (75) v Launceston 10.13 (73) - Aurora Stadium

Interstate Matches
Interstate Match (Saturday, 26 May 2012)
Victoria 20.17 (137) v Tasmania 3.11 (29) – Att: 1,236 at Blundstone Arena

2012 Foxtel Cup
(Saturday, 31 March 2012) - 
Morningside (NEAFL) 12.10 (82) v Launceston (TSL) 7.7 (49) – Metricon Stadium, Gold Coast * 
Note: This match was played as a curtain-raiser to the Gold Coast Suns v Adelaide Crows AFL fixture which drew an attendance of 12,790.

(Saturday, 14 April 2012) 
– Werribee (VFL) 26.9 (165) v Burnie (TSL) 5.2 (32) – Etihad Stadium, Melbourne * 
Note: This match was played as a curtain-raiser to the St Kilda v Western Bulldogs AFL fixture which drew an attendance of 28,971.

2012 Tasmanian State League Ladder

Regional Season Openers
(Saturday, 31 March 2012)
Burnie 20.12 (132) v Nth Hobart 10.14 (74) – West Park Oval 
Lauderdale 11.19 (85) v Hobart 6.8 (44) – Lauderdale Sports Ground (Twilight)
Nth Launceston 14.14 (98) v Devonport 11.5 (71) – Aurora Stadium (Saturday Night)

Round 1
(Wednesday, 4 April & Friday, 6 April 2012) 
Clarence 15.10 (100) v Glenorchy 9.6 (60) – KGV Football Park (Wednesday Night)
Nth Hobart 17.17 (119) v Hobart 10.8 (68) – North Hobart Oval (Friday) 
Lauderdale 17.18 (120) v Sth Launceston 13.12 (90) – Lauderdale Sports Ground (Friday) 
Launceston 13.19 (97) v Nth Launceston 12.15 (87) – Aurora Stadium (Friday Night) 
Burnie 25.14 (164) v Devonport 8.2 (50) – Devonport Oval (Friday Night)

Round 2
(Friday, 13 April & Saturday, 14 April 2012)
Lauderdale 13.9 (87) v Glenorchy 6.12 (48) – KGV Football Park (Friday Night) 
Clarence 28.20 (188) v Hobart 4.7 (31) – TCA Ground 
Launceston 22.12 (144) v Devonport 11.8 (74) – Windsor Park 
Sth Launceston 14.11 (95) v Nth Launceston 8.11 (59) – Youngtown Memorial Ground

Round 3
(Friday, 20 April & Saturday, 21 April 2012) 
Clarence 20.16 (136) v Nth Hobart 5.9 (39) - Blundstone Arena (Friday Night) 
Glenorchy 16.17 (113) v Hobart 9.8 (62) - TCA Ground 
Burnie 17.15 (117) v Lauderdale 8.9 (57) - Lauderdale Sports Ground
Launceston 11.13 (79) v Sth Launceston 7.11 (53) - Windsor Park 
Nth Launceston 19.20 (134) v Devonport 10.12 (72) - Devonport Oval (Saturday Night)

Round 4
(Saturday, 28 April & Sunday, 29 April 2012)
Clarence 18.12 (120) v Devonport 4.8 (32) - Blundstone Arena
Sth Launceston 15.17 (107) v Hobart 6.5 (41) - Youngtown Memorial Ground
Glenorchy 9.13 (67) v Nth Launceston 3.12 (30) - KGV Football Park (Night)
Burnie 22.17 (149) v Launceston 3.5 (23) -  West Park Oval (Sunday)
Lauderdale 13.8 (86) v Nth Hobart 11.8 (74) - North Hobart Oval (Sunday)

Round 5
(Saturday, 5 May & Sunday, 6 May 2012)
Clarence 16.19 (115) v Lauderdale 10.10 (70) - Blundstone Arena
Burnie 20.14 (134) v Nth Launceston 14.8 (92) - Aurora Stadium
Launceston 13.11 (89) v Glenorchy 12.10 (82) - KGV Football Park (Night)
Sth Launceston 13.12 (90) v Devonport 10.15 (75) - Devonport Oval (Night)
Nth Hobart 12.17  (89) v Hobart 13.5 (83) - TCA Ground (Sunday)

Round 6
(Saturday, 12 May 2012)
Nth Launceston 14.11 (95) v Nth Hobart 8.12 (60) - North Hobart Oval
Clarence 14.18 (102) v Sth Launceston 10.10 (70) - Youngtown Memorial Ground
Burnie 9.11 (65) v Glenorchy 9.4 (58) - West Park Oval
Launceston 18.15 (123) v Devonport 11.8 (74) - Aurora Stadium

Round 7
(Saturday, 19 May & Sunday, 20 May 2012) 
Burnie 22.24 (156) v Hobart 4.8 (32) - TCA Ground
Glenorchy 14.17 (101) v Nth Hobart 8.14 (62) - KGV Football Park
Lauderdale 16.12 (108) v Devonport 13.7 (85) - Devonport Oval
Clarence 12.20 (92) v Launceston 11.6 (72) - Blundstone Arena (Night)
Sth Launceston 13.8 (86) v Nth Launceston 12.9 (81) - Youngtown Memorial Ground (Sunday)

Round 8
(Saturday, 2 June & Sunday, 3 June 2012)
Nth Hobart 16.9 (105) v Devonport 13.12 (90) - North Hobart Oval
Burnie 17.17 (119) v  Sth Launceston 7.11 (53) - West Park Oval
Clarence 22.13 (145) v Hobart 7.6 (48) - TCA Ground (Sunday)
Lauderdale 17.7 (109) v Glenorchy 8.6 (54) - Lauderdale Sports Ground (Sunday) 
Launceston 10.10 (70) v Nth Launceston 8.6 (54) - Windsor Park (Sunday)

Round 9
(Friday, 8 June. Saturday, 9 June & Sunday, 10 June 2012)
Glenorchy 17.15 (117) v Hobart 6.1 (37) - KGV Football Park (Friday Night)
Lauderdale 12.21 (93) v Nth Hobart 9.8 (62) - Lauderdale Sports Ground
Clarence 14.12 (96) v Nth Launceston 10.9 (69) - Aurora Stadium
Launceston 17.10 (112) v Sth Launceston 6.13 (49) - Youngtown Memorial Ground
Burnie 11.18 (84) v Devonport 9.13 (67) - Devonport Oval (Sunday)

Round 10
(Saturday, 16 June & Sunday, 17 June 2012)
Glenorchy 15.10 (100) v Clarence 10.10 (70) - Blundstone Arena
Nth Hobart 8.8 (56) v Sth Launceston 4.9 (33) - Youngtown Memorial Ground
Burnie 13.10 (88) v Launceston 6.10 (46) - West Park Oval
Lauderdale 16.11 (107) v Hobart 8.7 (55) - TCA Ground (Sunday)

Round 11
(Saturday, 23 June 2012)
Clarence 16.12 (108) v Burnie 13.4 (82) - Blundstone Arena
Nth Hobart 17.16 (118) v Hobart 5.4 (34) - North Hobart Oval
Lauderdale 17.14 (116) v Nth Launceston 11.11 (77) - Aurora Stadium
Launceston 14.11 (95) v Glenorchy 12.6 (78) - Windsor Park
Devonport 11.16 (82) v Sth Launceston 12.9 (81) - Devonport Oval

Round 12 A
(Saturday, 30 June & Sunday, 1 July 2012)
Devonport 17.11 (113) v Hobart 14.14 (98) - TCA Ground
Clarence 12.7 (79) v Lauderdale 11.9 (75) - Lauderdale Sports Ground
Launceston 10.8 (68) v Nth Hobart 9.4 (58) - Windsor Park
Burnie 14.15 (99) v Nth Launceston 7.5 (47) - West Park Oval *
Glenorchy 15.12 (102) v Sth Launceston 7.17 (59) - KGV Football Park (Sunday)
Note: Burnie wore Black and Gold playing colours to honour the 1962 Burnie Tigers NWFU  premiership team.

Round 12 B
(Sunday, 8 July 2012)
Burnie 19.16 (130) v Sth Launceston 11.9 (75) - Youngtown Memorial Ground
Bye: Clarence, Lauderdale, Launceston, Glenorchy, Nth Hobart, Nth Launceston, Devonport & Hobart.

Round 13
(Saturday, 14 July & Sunday, 15 July 2012)
Glenorchy 18.4 (112) v Lauderdale 7.13 (55) - KGV Football Park 
Clarence 13.5 (83) v Nth Hobart 10.9 (69) - Blundstone Arena 
Nth Launceston 14.14 (98) v Hobart 2.9 (21) - Aurora Stadium 
Launceston 12.21 (93) v Devonport 7.7 (49) - Devonport Oval

Round 14
(Friday, 20 July. Saturday, 21 July & Sunday 22 July 2012)
Nth Launceston 10.9 (69) v Sth Launceston 5.8 (38) - Aurora Stadium (Friday Night) 
Nth Hobart 14.14 (98) v Glenorchy 9.11 (65) - North Hobart Oval 
Clarence 30.14 (194) v Hobart 2.6 (18) - Blundstone Arena 
Burnie 23.15 (153) v Devonport 8.7 (55) - West Park Oval 
Lauderdale 15.18 (108) v Launceston 10.11 (71) - Lauderdale Sports Ground (Sunday)

Round 15 A
(Saturday, 26 July & Monday, 28 July 2012)
Sth Launceston 18.16 (124) v Hobart 6.6 (42) - TCA Ground
Glenorchy 14.14 (98) v Clarence 10.10 (70) - KGV Football Park (Monday Night)

Round 15 B
(Saturday, 4 August 2012)
Nth Hobart 14.17 (101) v Nth Launceston 10.8 (68) - North Hobart Oval 
Launceston 13.14 (92) v Burnie 10.5 (65) - Windsor Park 
Lauderdale 21.6 (132) v Devonport 14.6 (90) - Devonport Oval

Round 16
(Saturday, 11 August 2012)
Glenorchy 22.18 (150) v Hobart 3.3 (21) - KGV Football Park
Lauderdale 14.12 (96) v Nth Hobart 9.9 (63) - Lauderdale Sports Ground
Launceston 24.14 (158) v Nth Launceston 3.3 (21) - Windsor Park
Sth Launceston 19.16 (130) v Devonport 11.5 (71) - Youngtown Memorial Ground
Burnie 17.19 (121) v Clarence 9.9 (63) - West Park Oval

Round 17
(Saturday, 18 August & Sunday, 19 August 2012) 
Lauderdale 16.27 (123) v Hobart 3.3 (21) - TCA Ground (Twilight Match) 
Burnie 16.17 (113) v Nth Launceston 6.8 (44) - Aurora Stadium 
Launceston 9.11 (65) v Sth Launceston 8.10 (58) - Youngtown Memorial Ground 
Glenorchy 18.12 (120) v Devonport 9.13 (67) - Devonport Oval 
Clarence 17.15 (117) v Nth Hobart 15.11 (101) - North Hobart Oval (Sunday)

Round 18
(Saturday, 25 August 2012) 
Glenorchy 17.23 (125) v Nth Hobart 13.2 (80) - North Hobart Oval 
Lauderdale 14.15 (99) v Clarence 13.8 (86) - Lauderdale Sports Ground 
Nth Launceston 16.15 (111) v Devonport 10.11 (71) - Aurora Stadium 
Launceston 21.18 (144) v Hobart 3.4 (22) - Windsor Park 
Burnie 8.15 (63) v Sth Launceston 2.8 (20) - West Park Oval

Elimination Final
(Saturday, 1 September 2012)
Lauderdale: 3.1 (19) | 6.2 (38) | 10.3 (63) | 14.8 (92) 
Glenorchy: 6.0 (36) | 9.3 (57) | 13.5 (83) | 13.5 (83) 
Attendance: 3,172 at North Hobart Oval (Double-Header)

Qualifying Final
(Saturday, 1 September 2012)
Launceston: 5.0 (30) | 6.3 (39) | 12.3 (75) | 18.9 (117) 
Clarence: 1.4 (10) | 4.7 (31) | 6.10 (46) | 8.16 (64) 
Attendance: 3,172 at North Hobart Oval (Double-Header)

First Semi Final
(Sunday, 9 September 2012) 
Clarence: 4.2 (26) | 7.8 (50) | 10.8 (68) | 16.11 (107) 
Lauderdale: 6.4 (40) | 10.6 (66) | 12.7 (79) | 14.8 (92) 
Attendance: 2,174 at North Hobart Oval

Second Semi Final
(Sunday, 9 September 2012) 
Burnie: 5.4 (34) | 6.5 (41) | 15.9 (99) | 17.10 (112) 
Launceston: 1.0 (6) | 4.6 (30) | 5.6 (36) | 9.13 (67) 
Attendance: 1,692 at West Park Oval

Preliminary Final
(Saturday, 15 September 2012) 
Launceston: 2.4 (16) | 4.10 (34) | 5.12 (42) | 9.14 (68) 
Clarence: 1.1 (7) | 3.2 (20) | 7.8 (50) | 8.12 (60) 
Attendance: 1,727 at Aurora Stadium (Night)

Grand Final
(Sunday, 22 September 2012) 
Burnie: 3.5 (23) | 8.9 (57) | 13.11 (89) | 16.14 (110) 
Launceston: 2.3 (15) | 3.4 (22) | 4.6 (30) | 9.8 (62)  
Attendance: 5,569 at Aurora Stadium

References

https://web.archive.org/web/20121026204829/http://australianfootball.com/seasons/season/TSL/2012

2012
2012 in Australian rules football